Defending champion Juan Carlos Ferrero defeated Guillermo Coria in the final, 6–2, 6–2 to win the singles tennis title at the 2003 Monte Carlo Masters.

Rafael Nadal entered the world's Top 100 in the ATP rankings for the first time after this tournament. He lost to Coria in the third round, which would remain his sole loss at the tournament until 2013.

Seeds

Draw

Finals

Top half

Section 1

Section 2

Bottom half

Section 3

Section 4

External links
 2003 Monte Carlo Masters Draw

2003 Monte Carlo Masters
Singles